Illinothrips is a genus of thrips in the family Phlaeothripidae.

Species
 Illinothrips rossi

References

Phlaeothripidae
Thrips
Thrips genera